Escort Group B2 was a convoy escort British formation of the Royal Navy which saw action during the Second World War, principally in the Battle of the Atlantic.
The group was under the command of Cdr Donald Macintyre, one of Britain's most successful anti-submarine warfare commanders.

Formation
Escort Group B2 was one of seven British escort groups which served with the Mid-Ocean Escort Force (MOEF), which provided convoy protection in the most dangerous midsection of the North Atlantic route.

Service history
The group commenced convoy escort duties in April 1942, in the critical mid-ocean section of the North Atlantic route, operating between Londonderry and St John's Newfoundland.

The first convoys, in the spring of 1942, were uneventful and as the pace of the Battle of the Atlantic hotted up in the summer and autumn the group's convoys were escorted without loss.

In October 1942, ON 138 came under attack but a vigorous defence by B2 ensured no ships were lost.
In December 1942 it was accompanying HX 219 when the convoy came under attack. Hesperus responded and counter-attacked and destroyed U-357  by ramming it. As a result, Hesperus was out of action for 2 months.
 
In February 1943 a depleted B2 under temporary command of Cdr Proudfoot escorted Convoy SC 118. This convoy came under attack by wolfpack Pfeil and lost eight ships for three U-boats destroyed in one of the hardest fought battles of the campaign.

In April during an attack on ONS 4,  ships of the group sank U-191.

In May in an attack on SC 129 B2 sank U-186 and damaged U-402 and U-223 for the loss of two ships.

A series of uneventful convoys followed, as the U-boat arm withdrew from the North Atlantic after Black May, a state of affairs which continued until the end of the year.

During this period the group had escorted over 30 convoys, totalling over 900 ships of which only 10 were lost.
 No warships were lost from the group, which accounted for three U-boats destroyed and two others damaged, and shared in the destruction of three others, in its 2-year career.

U-boats destroyed
 U-357, sunk by Hesperus and Vanessa on 26 December 1942 
 U-191, sunk by Hesperus on 23 April 1943 
 U-186 sunk by Hesperus on 12 May 1943

Convoys escorted

Senior Officer Escort

Notes

References
Clay Blair Hitler's U-Boat War [Volume 2]: The Hunted 1942–1945 (1998)  (2000 UK paperback ed.)
Paul Kemp  U-Boats Destroyed  (1997)  
Macintyre, Donald U-Boat Killer (1956) 
Axel Neistle  German U-Boat Losses during World War II  (1998). 
Stephen Roskill  The War at Sea 1939–1945  Vol III, pt I (1960)
 

Escort Groups of the Royal Navy in World War II